Tlanepantla Municipality is a  municipality in Puebla in south-eastern Mexico.

References

Municipalities of Puebla